Pedro Filipe Barbosa Moreira (born 20 December 1992), known as Pedrinho, is a Portuguese professional footballer who plays for Turkish club MKE Ankaragücü as a midfielder.

He recorded figures of 117 games and 17 goals in the second tier with Freamunde and Paços de Ferreira, winning the third division title with the former in 2014 and the second with the latter in 2019. He surpassed 125 Primeira Liga appearances for Paços and Gil Vicente, and won the Latvian Higher League during his brief spell at Riga in 2020.

Club career

Freamunde
Born in Cristelo (Paredes), Pedrinho moved from his hometown club FC Cristelo to S.C. Freamunde at the age of 11. He made his professional debut in the Segunda Liga on 22 January 2012, as a substitute for Bock in the last three minutes of a 3–0 home win against U.D. Oliveirense. He began playing regularly in the 2013–14 season as the side won the third division, and scored the decisive goal in the 3–2 victory over Clube Oriental de Lisboa in the final on 10 June.

Pedrinho scored his first goal in a professional league on 9 August 2014, as the campaign opened with a 1–0 win at home to Atlético Clube de Portugal. In 2015–16, he was the league's joint sixth highest scorer with a career-best 13 as his team came fifth; this included two goals on 23 January in a 3–0 defeat of visitors Vitória S.C. B.

Paços Ferreira
In July 2016, Pedrinho signed a four-year contract at nearby F.C. Paços de Ferreira in the Primeira Liga. In his third top-flight game, he scored twice in a 5–3 loss at Vitória de Guimarães. In 2018–19, he captained the team led by promotion specialist Vítor Oliveira to the second division title; he scored once on 13 January to conclude a 3–0 win at C.D. Cova da Piedade.

Riga
At the end of July 2020, out-of-contract Pedrinho headed abroad for the first time, to Riga FC in Latvia. On 18 September, in his career's first European match, he scored the only goal of a home win over San Marino's S.P. Tre Fiori in the second qualifying round of the UEFA Europa League. He ended the year as a Higher League winner.

Gil Vicente
On 23 January 2021, Pedrinho returned to his country's top flight on an 18-month deal at Gil Vicente FC. He scored once as the team climbed from 15th to 11th, an added-time penalty to decide a home victory against C.D. Santa Clara on 20 February.

Pedrinho contributed 33 matches and one goal in his only full season (37 overall, 13 assists), helping to qualification for the UEFA Europa Conference League as fifth.

Later career
On 15 June 2022, in spite having renewed his contract until 2025 shortly before, Pedrinho agreed to a two-year at deal at newly-promoted Turkish Süper Lig club MKE Ankaragücü.

Honours
Freamunde
Campeonato Nacional de Seniores: 2013–14

Paços de Ferreira
LigaPro: 2018–19

Riga
Latvian Higher League: 2020

References

External links

Portuguese League profile 

1992 births
Living people
People from Paredes, Portugal
Sportspeople from Porto District
Portuguese footballers
Association football midfielders
Primeira Liga players
Liga Portugal 2 players
Campeonato de Portugal (league) players
S.C. Freamunde players
AC Vila Meã players
F.C. Paços de Ferreira players
Gil Vicente F.C. players
Latvian Higher League players
Riga FC players
Süper Lig players
MKE Ankaragücü footballers
Portuguese expatriate footballers
Expatriate footballers in Latvia
Expatriate footballers in Turkey
Portuguese expatriate sportspeople in Latvia
Portuguese expatriate sportspeople in Turkey